Jernej Abramič (born December 17, 1964 in Nova Gorica) is a Yugoslav-born, Slovenian slalom canoer who competed from the early 1980s to the late 1990s. He won five medals for Yugoslavia at the ICF Canoe Slalom World Championships with a gold (K-1 team: 1989), two silvers (K-1: 1987, K-1 team: 1987) and two bronzes (K-1: 1989, K-1 team: 1985).

Abramič also finished seventh for Slovenia in the K-1 event at the 1996 Summer Olympics in Atlanta.

References

1964 births
Canoeists at the 1996 Summer Olympics
Living people
Olympic canoeists of Slovenia
Slovenian male canoeists
Yugoslav male canoeists
People from Nova Gorica
Medalists at the ICF Canoe Slalom World Championships